Matthew Nathaniel Cleveland (born September 15, 2002) is an American college basketball player for the Florida State Seminoles of the Atlantic Coast Conference (ACC).

High school career
Cleveland played basketball for Cambridge High School in Milton, Georgia. For his junior season, he transferred to Pace Academy in Atlanta, Georgia. Cleveland averaged 22.3 points, 8.1 rebounds, 2.9 assists and 2.9 steals per game as a junior, and led his team to the Class 3A state title. He was named Georgia 3A Player of the Year. As a senior, Cleveland averaged 22.8 points, 10.6 rebounds, 2.6 assists and two steals per game. He guided his team to a 28–2 record and the Class 2A state championship, earning Georgia 2A Player of the Year and The Atlanta Journal-Constitution Atlanta/South Fulton Player of the Year recognition. He was named to the United States team for the Nike Hoop Summit.

Recruiting
Cleveland was considered a five-star recruit by 247Sports and Rivals, and a four-star recruit by ESPN. On July 21, 2020, he committed to playing college basketball for Florida State over offers from Kansas, Michigan, Stanford and NC State.

College career
On November 24, 2021, Cleveland scored 17 points including a put-back basket with 2.1 seconds remaining in overtime in an 81–80 victory over Boston University. On February 26, 2022, he scored 20 points and hit a three-pointer at the buzzer in a 64-63 win against Virginia. Cleveland was named ACC Sixth Man of The Year.

References

External links
Florida State Seminoles bio
USA Basketball bio

2002 births
Living people
American men's basketball players
Florida State Seminoles men's basketball players
Basketball players from Atlanta
Pace Academy alumni
Shooting guards
Small forwards